King's and Albert was a federal electoral district in New Brunswick, Canada, that was represented in the House of Commons of Canada from 1904 to 1917.

This riding was created in 1903 from King's and Albert ridings. It consisted of the county of King's and the county of Albert.

It was abolished in 1914 when it was redistributed into Royal and St. John—Albert ridings.

Members of Parliament

This riding elected the following Members of Parliament:

Election results

See also 

 List of Canadian federal electoral districts
 Past Canadian electoral districts

External links
Riding history from the Library of Parliament

Former federal electoral districts of New Brunswick